Lori Fisler Damrosch is an American legal scholar of public international law and U.S. law of foreign relations. She is currently the Hamilton Fish Professor of International Law and Diplomacy at Columbia Law School.

Career 
After graduating from Yale Law School in 1976, Damrosch clerked for Judge Jon O. Newman at the U.S. District Court, District of Connecticut. From 1977 to 1981, she worked at the Office of the Legal Advisor at the U.S. Department of State. From 1981 to 1984, Damrosch was an associate at the New York office of Sullivan & Cromwell. In 1984, Damrosch joined the faculty of Columbia Law School.

Honors and awards 
 Wolfgang Friedmann Award, Columbia Journal of Transnational Law, 2015
 Certificate of Merit, American society of International Law, 1988
 Francis Deák Prize, American Journal of International law, 1981
 Superior Honow Award, U.S. Department of State, 1980

References 

Columbia Law School faculty
American legal scholars
Living people
Yale Law School alumni
1953 births
American Journal of International Law editors
Members of the Institut de Droit International
Presidents of the American Society of International Law